
"Rain Shower", also "Shower" or "Sonagi," (소나기) is a Korean short story written by Korean writer Hwang Sun-won in 1952. A sonagi is a brief but heavy rain shower that starts suddenly, usually on a hot afternoon. In Hwang’s story, the rain shower symbolizes the short but heart-rending love between the boy and the girl. The story begins with the boy encountering the girl playing by the stream on his way back home.
 
Although many of Hwang’s short stories are notable, “Rain Shower” is cited as his timeless Korean classic by Koreans. Koreans of all ages are acquainted with this story. It is famous for its poignant depiction of the Korean countryside and of innocent adolescent love. The picturesque scenes from this story stir nostalgia for many people.

“Rain Shower,” like many of Hwang’s other stories, was written while he lived as a refugee with his family during the Korean War.

The scene from the story where the boy and the girl avoid the rain shower together has become a favorite in many Korean romantic films.  There is a 1979 Korean film based on the short story (also called Sonagi). Two notable films that heavily reference the story include the 2001 Korean romantic comedy, My Sassy Girl, and the 2003 Korean melodrama, The Classic, and 2004 Korean Dramas Munhwa Broadcasting Corporation Tropical Nights in December Episode 1 parodies. And recently, it was also made into an animation 'Rain shower(소나기)'.

Sonagi Village
In 2009, Sonagi Village and Hwang Soon Won Literary House are opened by Yang-pyeong gun at Sooneung-ri, Seojong-myeon.

See also
Korean literature
Contemporary culture of South Korea

References

External links
 One version of English Translation of Sonagi
 Musical version of Sonagi

1959 short stories
Korean short stories